The Eastern Catholic Community in Hawaii encompasses all Catholics of the Eastern Catholic Churches. It is based in Honolulu, Hawaii.

History
Eastern Catholics from western Ukraine began arriving in 1897, as part of a wave of emigration from the Austro-Hungarian Empire. However these were often ensnared into indentured servitude on sugar plantations in Hawaii, and were not able to develop their own churches. Ukrainian Catholic, Orthodox, and Jewish clergy in mainland North America pressured the San Francisco Chronicle to investigate, and on July 24, 1899 the newspaper's headline blared "Slavery in Hawaii Under the American Flag". Once freed, many of the Ukrainians departed for Canada, where there was a larger wave of Ukrainian settlement and many had relatives.

In 1975, the community began meeting for Divine Liturgy at St. Anthony Roman Catholic Church, Kalihi Kai, Honolulu with the late Reverend Archimandrite Jules C. E. Riotte, Episcopal vicar for the Eastern Rite. The community subsequently met at Saint Sophia Chapel in Waianae, with Reverend Philip Harmon as its pastor. 

On October 29, 2005, Most Reverend Richard Stephen Seminack, Eparch of the Ukrainian Catholic Eparchy of Saint Nicholas in Chicago visited Hawaii, announced the retirement of Father Harmon, the move of the parish to Kuliouou, and the grant of bi-ritual eparchial faculties to Reverend Halbert Weidner, C.O., pastor of Holy Trinity Church. Bishop Seminack installed Father Weidner as the pastor of Saint Sophia Ukrainian Greek Catholic mission parish.

The Ukrainian church is no longer at 5919 Kalanianaole Hwy., Honolulu, Hawaii. A physical location resides at 1300 Pali Hwy, Suite 204, Honolulu, Hawaii  96813.

While ritually and ethnically the same, the Eastern Catholic Community of Hawaii is distinct from the Eastern Orthodox Communities of Hawaii.

See also
Roman Catholic Diocese of Honolulu
Orthodox Church in Hawaii

References
 Honolulu Star Bulletin, April 15, 2006, article by Mary Adamski entitled "Old Egg Artistry (Pysankay)"
  Honolulu Star Bulletin, October 29, 2005, article by Mary Adamski entitled "Church gets fresh start in new home; St. Sophia Ukrainian Catholic Church aims for regular services with its new priest"

External links
St. Sophia Greek Catholic Mission
Saint Nicholas Ukrainian Catholic Eparchy
Ukrainian Catholic Eparchy of Saint Nicholas in Chicago - listing at catholic-hierarchy.org
 - An Orthodox wiki for Orthodox Christians

Eastern Catholicism in the United States
Catholicism in Hawaii
Ukrainian Catholic Metropolia of Philadelphia
Christian organizations established in 1975